Harald Vollmar (born 24 April 1947) is a retired East German pistol shooter. He competed in the individual 50 m event at the 1968, 1972, 1976 and 1980 Olympics and won two silver and one bronze medal, placing fifth in 1972. Between 1976 and 1979 he held the world record in the 10 meter air pistol.

References

1947 births
Living people
People from Bad Frankenhausen
German male sport shooters
ISSF pistol shooters
Olympic shooters of East Germany
Shooters at the 1968 Summer Olympics
Shooters at the 1972 Summer Olympics
Shooters at the 1976 Summer Olympics
Shooters at the 1980 Summer Olympics
Olympic silver medalists for East Germany
Olympic bronze medalists for East Germany
Olympic medalists in shooting
Sportspeople from Thuringia
Medalists at the 1968 Summer Olympics
Medalists at the 1976 Summer Olympics
Medalists at the 1980 Summer Olympics